Not Your Average Travel Guide (NYATG) is a travel show on the Travel Channel, it airs Saturdays at 10 p.m. and 10:30 p.m. ET/PT. It is hosted by seven different "Travel Guides", Bill Delano, Brian Knappenberger, Carrie Lederer, Kate Ward, Shane O, Joseph Van Harken, and Brad Hasse. The show features a specific city in each episode lasting approximately 30 minutes.  The show attempts to give an unconventional personal tour of the world, also featured during the show are small travel tips and facts.  The show debuted on November 17, 2006 at 8 p.m. ET/PT.

Format

There's more History
A view of the historical places in the city.

How to get around
The best way to get around the city and usually most economical.

Meat and Potatoes
Places and sites everyone has to see in a city.  These are usually tourist heavy places.

Eat Here
Different kinds of local food and restaurants to visit.

Culture Vulture
A local expert in the culture that shows the tour guide and viewers additional history and little know/off the beaten path locations.

Online on the Move
This segment the tour guide will go find internet access in the city, usually an internet cafe or the hotel they're staying at.  Then they read posts from the official forums by viewers who have visited the location being featured, and see where the viewers think they should go and what they need to see.

What's Happening
Event's going on in the city, whether it be annually or daily.

External links
NYATG's official website.
NYATG's official forums.
 

Travel Channel original programming